Sir William Evans Ryves de Montmorency, 3rd Baronet (7 November 1763 – 14 April 1829) was an Anglo-Irish politician.

Born William Morres, he was the son of Sir William Morres, 1st Baronet and Mary Juliana Ryves, and the half-brother of Sir Haydock Morres, 2nd Baronet. On 11 October 1774 he succeeded to his half-brother's baronetcy. Between 1785 and 1790 he was the Member of Parliament for Newtownards in the Irish House of Commons. On 17 June 1815 his surname was legally changed to de Montmorency by Royal Licence. On his death, his title became extinct.

References

1763 births
1829 deaths
18th-century Anglo-Irish people
19th-century Anglo-Irish people
Baronets in the Baronetage of Ireland
Irish MPs 1783–1790
Members of the Parliament of Ireland (pre-1801) for County Down constituencies